The Tubbataha Natural Park, also known as the Tubbataha Reefs Natural Park, is a protected area of the Philippines located in the middle of the Sulu Sea.

In December 1993, the UNESCO declared the Tubbataha Reefs National Park as a World Heritage Site as a unique example of an atoll reef with a very high density of marine species; the North Islet serving as a nesting site for birds and marine turtles. The site is an excellent example of a pristine coral reef with a spectacular 100-m perpendicular wall, extensive lagoons and two coral islands. In 1999, Ramsar listed Tubbataha as one of the wetlands of international importance. In 2008, the reef was nominated at New7Wonders of Nature.

The national park and the rest of the Philippine archipelago is part of the Coral Triangle, recognized as a center of marine biodiversity containing 75% of the described coral species and 40% of the world's reef fish. The area is under a grave threat due to overfishing and destructive fishing practices. Research of scientists visiting the reefs since the 1980s revealed that the Tubbataha Reefs Natural Park contains no less than 600 fish species, 360 coral species, 11 shark species, 13 dolphin and whale species, and 100 bird species. The reefs also serve as a nesting ground for Hawksbill and Green sea turtles.

Geography 

Jessie Beazley Reef 

Geology

The Tubbataha Reef is situated on the Cagayan Ridge, composing of extinct underwater volcanoes.  Being a true atoll structure, it is believed that the atolls of Tubbataha were formed thousands of years ago as fringing reefs and volcanic islands.  This is based on Charles Darwin's theory that atolls are formed when a volcano erupts and afterwards an island is born. When the volcanoes became extinct and the islands subsided over a long time, only the corals remain, growing towards the sunlight.  The very big corals seen today surrounding the lagoons are originally the fringing reefs.

History

Etymology
The word tubbataha is a combination of two Sama-Bajau words: tubba and taha, which together means "a long reef exposed at low tide".  Historically, Sama-Bajau peoples, who have a nomadic lifestyle, visit the reef from time to time.  Although people from the islands of Cagayancillo are frequent visitors of the reef.  They used the native vessel banka to sail and fish on "Gusong", their local name for the Tubbataha.

Protection

Tubbataha's isolation, located in the middle of the Sulu Sea far from inhabitants of the nearest populated islands, had preserved its marine resources from over-exploitation over the years.  The two islets in Tubbataha have no source of freshwater thus preventing habitation.

In the 1980s, fishermen reaching Tubbataha increased in numbers with the advent in motorized bangkas, instead of the traditional sailboats. Fish had declined in other fishing grounds because of overfishing and soon Tubbataha became a fishing destination because of its abundant marine life.  Many fishermen used destructive fishing techniques like cyanide and dynamite fishing to maximize their catch.

Scuba divers and environmentalists campaigned to make the reefs a national marine park. This was the first time that the Philippines had declared a marine area as a national park.

In the early years of law enforcement by the Presidential Task Force, the rangers were housed in a simple canvas tent.  In 1996 a wooden structure was built but shifting sand soon rendered its foundations unstable. At present, the marine park rangers are housed in a styrofoam-reinforced concrete structure on the Southeast Islet on Tubbatha's North Atoll.

The National Marine Park was enlarged in 2006 to include the Jessie Beazley Reef. The national park was also reclassified as a natural park. It is guarded by armed rangers 24 hours/7 days a week.

In 2013, during the 25th anniversary of the Tubbataha Reef's national park declaration, the World Wildlife Fund announced plans to construct a modernized ranger station on a different site to effectively monitor and deal with illegal poaching activities. The said project would cost PHP50 million.

Recognition
It was declared a World Heritage Site by the United Nations Educational, Scientific, and Cultural Organization (UNESCO) in December 1993 and falls under the protective management of the Department of National Defense (DND) of the Philippines. It is currently under technical supervision by the Palawan Council for Sustainable Development (PCSD) and the Department of Environment and Natural Resources (DENR).

In 1999, Ramsar listed Tubbataha as one of the Wetlands of International Importance because of the variety of its marine life species and valuable role as a habitat for various animals.

The Tubbataha Reef Natural Park was nominated by New7Wonders Foundation in the New 7 Wonders of Nature in 2007 but lost.

In November 2015, Tubbataha was declared by the ASEAN's Centre for Biodiversity as the 35th ASEAN Heritage Park.

On July 25, 2017, the Tubbataha Reef was designated as a Particularly Sensitive Sea Area (PSSA)—and an "area to be avoided"—by the International Maritime Organization.

Management
The islands are uninhabited except for the rotating 10 – 12 park rangers at the Ranger's Station located at the southernmost tip of the North Atoll. The combined team from the Philippine Navy, Philippine Coast Guard, Municipality of Cagayancillo and the TMO. Stationed for two months at a time, their job is to protect the park from illegal activities including fishing and collection of other marine life.

Ecology
Over 1000 species of marine life inhabit the reef with many considered endangered. Animal species found include manta rays, lionfish, sea turtles, clownfish, and sharks.  Tubbataha has become a popular site for seasoned sport divers because of its coral "walls" where the shallow coral reef abruptly ends giving way to great depths. These "walls" are also habitats for many colonies of fish. Giant trevally (jacks), hammerhead sharks, barracudas, manta rays, palm-sized Moorish idols, napoleon wrasse, parrotfish, and moray eels live in the sanctuary. There also have been reported sightings of whale sharks and tiger sharks. Tubbataha is even home to cetaceans and the hawksbill sea turtles (Eretmochelys imbricata) which are critically endangered species. Being a UNESCO World Heritage site, all living organisms are protected.

Vivid corals cover more than two-thirds of the area and the waters around the reef are places of refuge for numerous marine lives. The seemingly diverse ecosystem of this sanctuary rivals the Great Barrier Reef – having 350 coral species and 500 fish species. In June 2009 an outbreak of the crown-of-thorns starfish was observed, possibly affecting the ecological functioning of this relatively pristine coral reef.

Tourism
Tubbataha is considered one of the best dive sites in the world according to CNN Travel. The park is about ten hours by boat from the city. All trips are vessel-based or "liveaboard" as there are no accommodation facilities. Visitors stay on the yacht/boat throughout their stay in the park. During the diving season, ships dedicated for diving are usually booked years in advance especially during Easter and the Asian holidays called "Golden Week".

As of March 2011, the park entrance fee for individuals is pegged at US$75.00 or PHP3,000.00. In September 2010, Palawan governor Abraham Kahlil Mitra announced that local residents of Palawan province can enter the Tubbataha Reef without paying the conservation fee. Divers are advised to book their trips towards the middle or end of April as calm seas from April to June have a short window.

Although the sand bars around Tubbataha are considered off limits to human beings, tourists are allowed to set foot at the Ranger Station where they can purchase souvenirs and tour the facility.

₱1000 bill- The park is featured on the reverse side of the 2010 series of the Philippine one thousand peso bill.

Ship grounding incidents

Rainbow Warrior
Greenpeace blamed the accident on inaccurate charts provided by the Philippine government. The BBC quoted Greenpeace official Red Constantino as saying "The chart indicated we were a mile and a half" from the coral reef when the ship ran aground. Greenpeace paid the fine anyhow.

USS Guardian

On January 17, 2013, the US Navy minesweeper USS Guardian ran aground at Tubbataha Reef.  The U.S. Government initially blamed the grounding on faulty maps.  Between 2011 and January 2013, before the grounding of the USS Guardian, there were eleven incidents involving ships, including two Philippine ships. The U.S. Navy concluded that towing the ship off the reef would cause more damage and decided to dismantle the ship in place.  On March 30, the last section of the ship was removed from the reef. No evidence of fuel leakage from the grounded vessel were found.

On April 8, 2013 the U.S. Navy turned over digital navigation charts and other relevant documents and data of the Guardian to the Philippine Maritime Casualty Investigating Team (MCIT) and responded to various technical and substantive queries.  The MCIT conducted its own independent investigation and made recommendations on how to avoid such incidents in the future.

The U.S. Government apologized for the incident and relieved five officers from duty. The initial investigation clearly indicated that these officers did not adhere to standard US Navy navigation procedures.

The U.S. Federal Government was assessed a fine of 24,000 Philippine pesos (about US$600) per square meter. On January 20, 2015, the United States Government paid to the Philippine government a total of 87 million Philippine pesos, or US$1.97 million – 59 million Philippine pesos for the damage and another 29 million pesos to reimburse for services provided by the Philippine Coast Guard.

F/V Min Long Yu
On April 8, 2013, the F/V Min Long Yu, a Chinese fishing vessel, ran aground some  nautical miles east of the Tubbataha Reef ranger station. The fishing vessel had 12 crew members and was suspected of illegal fishing.  On board, what was found instead were 400 boxes of frozen scaly anteaters  (locally called as pangolin), sources unknown at the time of arrest.

See also
List of World Heritage Sites in the Philippines
List of protected areas of the Philippines
List of reefs
ASEAN Heritage Parks
National Geospatial-Intelligence Agency
Apo Reef
Verde Island Passage

References

External links

Tubbataha Reef Marine Park – UNESCO World Heritage Centre
Tubbataha Reefs National Marine Park – The Official Tubbataha Reefs National Marine Park Website
Palawan Council for Sustainable Development
Sulu Sea. Encyclopedia of Earth. Eds. P.Saundry & C.J.Cleveland. Washington DC by C.Michael Hogan. 2011.
Tubbataha Reef- Cagayancillo  – . Tubbataha Reef is recognised as one of the most remarkable coral reefs on our planet.

Islands of Palawan
Landforms of the Sulu Sea
World Heritage Sites in the Philippines
ASEAN heritage parks
Coral reefs
Marine sanctuaries
Ramsar sites in the Philippines
Natural parks of the Philippines
Underwater diving sites in the Philippines
Reefs of the Pacific Ocean
Tourist attractions in Palawan
Reefs of the Philippines